Miltesthus marginatus is a species of beetle in the family Cerambycidae, the only species in the genus Miltesthus.

References

Elaphidiini